The Vale of Clwyd and Conwy Football League was a football league formed in 2011 following the split of the Clwyd Football League, which itself was formed in 1974 as an amalgamation of the Dyserth and the Halkyn Mountain League. The Premier Division was in the fifth level of the Welsh football league system in North Wales. The league folded in 2020 due to a reorganisation of the Welsh football league pyramid, with many teams joining the North Wales Coast East Football League.

The league hosted several cup competitions:  The President's Cup, The Premier Cup, The Halkyn Cup and the REM Jones Cup. Its members competed in the FAW Trophy, Barritt Cup and Welsh Cup competitions as well.  Along with members of the Anglesey League and the Caernarfon & District League, league teams competed in the North Wales Coast Junior Cup.

Member clubs for final 2019–20 season

Premier Division

Abergele
Bro Cernyw
Cerrigydrudion
Llandudno Athletic
Llanelwy Athletic
Llanfairfechan Town
Llansannan 
Meliden
Rhos United 
Rhuddlan Town
Y Glannau

First Division

Betws-y-Coed
Denbigh Development
Henllan
Llandudno Amateurs reserves
Llanfairfechan Town reserves
Llysfaen
Machno United
North Football Association
Penrhyn Bay Dragons
Rhyl All Stars

Divisional champions

Premier Division

2011–12: Rhuddlan Town
2012–13: St Asaph City
2013–14: Llannefydd
2014–15: Prestatyn Sports
2015–16: Llandudno Albion
2016–17: Llannefydd
2017–18: Kinmel Bay
2018–19: Llandudno Amateurs
2019–20: Rhuddlan Town

First Division

2011-12: Betws-yn-Rhos 
2012-13: Machno United
2013–14: Conwy Legion United
2014–15: Prestatyn Sports reserves
2015–16: Llanfairfechan Town
2016–17: Cerrigydrudion
2017–18: Llandudno Amateurs
2018–19: Llanelwy Athletic
2019–20: North Football Association

References

5
Wales
2011 establishments in Wales
Sports leagues established in 2011
Sports leagues disestablished in 2020
2020 disestablishments in Wales
Defunct football competitions in Wales